Shashi Kiran Shetty (born 7 June 1957) is the founder and chairman of Allcargo Group, which comprises companies Allcargo Logistics, ECU Worldwide, Gati Limited and others.

Early life and education 
Shetty was born on 7 June 1957 in Bantwal, a small town in Dakshina Kannada district, Karnataka, India. He pursued his bachelor's degree in commerce from Shri Venkatramana Swamy College. Later, in 1978 he moved to Mumbai for employment.

Career
Starting his career in the logistics industry in 1978 with Intermodal Transport and Trading Systems Private Limited, he subsequently moved to Forbes Gokak. At 25, he established his first business venture, Trans India Freight Services Pvt. Ltd.

In 1994, Shetty started Allcargo Logistics Limited which commenced operations in 1994.

Experienced in the logistics sector, Shetty guided Allcargo’s entry into verticals that include Container Freight Stations in 2003, contract logistics in 2016, and logistics parks in 2018. In 2005, he steered the acquisition of global non-vessel operating common carrier ECU-Line (now ECU Worldwide). Several other mergers and acquisitions Shetty steered over the past decade which includes Gati Limited in 2020 and Nordicon in 2021.

Shetty has been appointed by the Ministry of Education (India), as the Chairman of the Society and Board of Governors at National Institute of Industrial Engineering (NITIE), Mumbai, for a tenure of four years starting November 2020.

Personal life
Shetty is married to Arathi Shetty, who spearheads Allcargo's CSR arm, Avashya Foundation. He has one son, Vaishnav Shetty, and one daughter, Shloka Shetty.

Awards 

 Appointed as Commander of the Order of Leopold II by King Philippe of Belgium in 2015.  
 Received an Honorary Doctorate from the Mangalore University in 2015.
 Lifetime Contribution to Freight Award at The Global Freight Awards 2015, Llyod's Loading List-Informa, London.

References

Businesspeople from Mumbai
Indian billionaires
Tulu people
1959 births
Living people
Mangaloreans
Commanders of the Order of Leopold II